The Brave Little Toaster to the Rescue is a 1997 American animated musical film. Unlike other novellas in "The Brave Little Toaster" lineup, it is the first film not to be based on the novella of the same name by Thomas M. Disch. It is the sequel to The Brave Little Toaster (1987). The film was released direct-to-video on May 20, 1997, in the United Kingdom and on May 25, 1999, in the United States by Walt Disney Home Video.

A sequel, The Brave Little Toaster Goes to Mars, was released in 1998, which was strangely released first as the film took place after To the Rescue when Rob McGoarty became a father.

Plot
Rob McGoarty, the owner of the appliances, and the one referred to as "The Master", is in his last days of college while simultaneously working at a veterinary clinic. One night, while finishing his thesis, his computer crashes due to a computer virus. The appliances, along with a rat named Ratso, seek to help Rob by finding and reversing the effects of his computer virus. Meanwhile, Mack, Rob's lab assistant, plots to sell the injured animals Rob had been tending to a Santa Clarita laboratory named "Tartarus Laboratories". The appliances discover an abandoned, old prototype TLW-728 supercomputer named Wittgenstein in the basement. Wittgenstein reveals that he is living on one rare vacuum tube, a WFC-11-12-55, due to being infected by a computer virus. The appliances learn that unless they find a replacement quickly, Wittgenstein's vacuum tube will blow and lead to his death.

In an attempt to return Wittgenstein to his full capacity, Radio and Ratso go to the storage building of the college to find the WFC-11-12-55 tube. However, when Radio and Ratso return with the tube, they accidentally break it during an argument. Wittgenstein does his best to survive, but the virus causes him to blow his remaining tube and he dies. Guilt-ridden over condemning the animals to their doom at Tartarus Laboratories, Radio gives up his own tube, sacrificing himself. The appliances install Radio's tube in Wittgenstein and he wakes up with boosted power that regenerates all of his other tubes and destroys all the viruses within him. The appliances and Wittgenstein alert Rob and his girlfriend, Chris, to Mack's scheme. The appliances create a makeshift vehicle out of a modem, an office cart, and a car battery and pursue Mack's truck with Rob, Chris, and some guard dogs sent by Wittgenstein following them. They manage to lure the police to the front of the truck (causing the appliances to crash into the back) and have Mack arrested. After discovering the appliances in the truck, Rob and Chris assume that Mack had also planned to sell Rob's stuff, but Rob wonders where Radio is. Later, they discover Wittgenstein and Radio in the basement, but Rob is dismayed that Radio's tube is missing. Rob proposes to Chris and she replaces Radio's tube with a new one she found in Nome, reviving him. Wittgenstein restores Rob's thesis and is later sold to a museum to be upgraded with modern technology. In the end, all of the animals are adopted by new owners except Ratso, who Rob and Chris decide to keep as their pet. They leave college with their appliances and Ratso, planning to start a new and happy life together.

Voice cast
 Deanna Oliver as Toaster, an inspiring pop-up two-slice toaster who is the leader of the clan of small appliances. Toaster is courageous, intelligent, kind, thoughtful, and warmhearted.
 Timothy Stack as Lampy, an easily impressed yet slightly irascible desktop gooseneck lamp. He is bright but tends to be ironically dimwitted, though he has a couple of good points.
 Roger Kabler as Radio, a wisecracking dial A.M. radio alarm clock whose personality parodies loud and pretentious announcers.
 Eric Lloyd as Blanky, an electric blanket with an innocent demeanor. 
 Thurl Ravenscroft as the Kirby, a very deep-voiced, individualistic upright vacuum cleaner who dons a cynical, cantankerous attitude towards the other appliances. 
 Brian Doyle-Murray as Wittgenstein, a prototype vacuum-tube-based supercomputer. He is powered by a very rare cathode radio tube called the WFC-11-12-55. He was outmoded when transistors were invented. By the start of the film, he is infected with a computer virus, causing him to function improperly.
 Chris Young as Master Rob McGroarty, a university student, and the original human owner of the five appliances.
 Jessica Tuck as Chris, Rob's tomboyish, supportive girlfriend.
 Alfre Woodard as Maisie, she is a sweet cat and protective of her three kittens. Though she initially did not like Ratso because of his rude behavior, by the end of the film, they become good friends.
 Andy Milder as Ratso, a rat who is initially angry about being kept as a pet by Rob. He is rude to almost everyone, but as the movie progresses, Ratso's heart begins to warm to others.
 Jonathan Benair as Jim Bob, the assistant of Mack McCro. He and Mack plan to take the animals to Tartarus Laboratory.
 Eddie Bracken as Sebastian the Monkey, an old monkey who was the victim of the cruel experiments of Tartarus Laboratories and as a result has a mutilated and bandaged hand.
 Andy Daly as Murgatroid, a friendly snake who speaks with a heavy sibilance.
 Eddie Deezen as Charlie
 Paddi Edwards as Lab Computer
 Marc Allen Lewis as Security Guard
 Ross Mapletoft as Modem
 Kevin Meaney as Computer, a home computer who lives in Rob's house.
 Victoria Jackson as Mouse, a mouse.
 Jay Mohr as Mack McCro, the former assistant of Rob McGroarty. Unlike the latter, he doesn't care about animals' feelings. He only cares about making money and intends to sell the animals (which Rob has been taking care of) to Tartarus Laboratories.
 Danny Nucci as Alberto, a Chihuahua with a broken leg who speaks with a Mexican accent.
 Laurel Green as Campus Student
 Neil Ross as Security Camera and Police Man
 B.J. Ward as Police Lady
 Frank Welker as the Dobermans
 Nancy Cartwright as Virus
 Aretha Franklin as Homebuilt Computer

Songs
Alexander Janko composed the film's score. In addition to the original songs, "I'm Into Something Good" by Herman's Hermits is played at the film's opening.

Notes

References

External links

 
 
 
 

1997 animated films
1997 direct-to-video films
1997 films
1990s American animated films
1990s fantasy adventure films
1990s musical films
American sequel films
American children's animated adventure films
American children's animated comedy films
American children's animated fantasy films
American direct-to-video films
American children's animated musical films
American fantasy adventure films
Direct-to-video animated films
Direct-to-video interquel films
Direct-to-video sequel films
Films set in the 1980s
Buena Vista Home Entertainment direct-to-video films
Hyperion Pictures films
Animated films about rats
Films with screenplays by Willard Carroll
1990s children's animated films
The Brave Little Toaster
Films produced by Donald Kushner
The Kushner-Locke Company films
1990s English-language films